The 1964–1965 New York World's Fair was a world's fair that held over 140 pavilions and 110 restaurants, representing 80 nations (hosted by 37), 24 US states, and over 45 corporations with the goal and the final result of building exhibits or attractions at Flushing Meadows–Corona Park in Queens, New York City. The immense fair covered  on half the park, with numerous pools or fountains, and an amusement park with rides near the lake. However, the fair did not receive official support or approval from the Bureau of International Expositions (BIE).

Hailing itself as a "universal and international" exposition, the fair's theme was "Peace Through Understanding", dedicated to "Man's Achievement on a Shrinking Globe in an Expanding Universe". American companies dominated the exposition as exhibitors. The theme was symbolized by a 12-story-high, stainless-steel model of the Earth called the Unisphere, built on the foundation of the Perisphere from the 1939 World's Fair. The fair ran for two six-month seasons, April 22 – October 18, 1964, and April 21 – October 17, 1965. Admission price for adults (13 and older) was $2.00 in 1964 ( after calculating for inflation). Admission in 1965 increased to $2.50 ( after calculating for inflation). In both years, children (2–12) admission cost $1.00 ( after calculating for inflation).

The fair is noted as a showcase of mid-twentieth-century American culture and technology. The nascent Space Age, with its vista of promise, was well represented. More than 51 million people attended the fair, though fewer than the hoped-for 70 million. It remains a touchstone for many American Baby Boomers who visited the optimistic exposition as children, before the turbulent years of the Vietnam War and many to be forthcoming cultural changes.

In many ways the fair symbolized a grand consumer show, covering many products then-produced in America for transportation, living, and consumer electronic needs in a way that would never be repeated at future world's fairs in North America. American manufacturers of pens, chemicals, computers, and automobiles had a major presence. This fair gave many attendees their first interaction with computer equipment. Corporations demonstrated the use of mainframe computers, computer terminals with keyboards and CRT displays, teletype machines, punch cards, and telephone modems in an era when computer equipment was kept in back offices away from the public, decades before the Internet and home computers were at everyone's disposal.

Site history
The selected site, Flushing Meadows–Corona Park in the borough of Queens, was originally a natural wetland straddling the Flushing River. Flushing had been a Dutch settlement, named after the city of Vlissingen (anglicized into "Flushing"). The site was then converted into the Corona Ash Dumps, which were featured prominently in F. Scott Fitzgerald's The Great Gatsby as the "Valley of Ashes". The site was used for the 1939-1940 New York World's Fair, and at the conclusion of the fair, was used as a park.

Preceding these fairs was the 1853–1854 Exhibition of the Industry of All Nations, located in the New York Crystal Palace at what is now Bryant Park in the New York City borough of Manhattan.

Beginnings
The 1964–1965 Fair was conceived by a group of New York businessmen who remembered their childhood experiences at the 1939 New York World's Fair. Thoughts of an economic boon to the city as the result of increased tourism was a major reason for holding another fair 25 years after the 1939–1940 extravaganza. Then-New York City mayor, Robert F. Wagner, Jr., commissioned Frederick Pittera, a producer of international fairs and exhibitions, and author of the history of International Fairs & Exhibitions for the Encyclopædia Britannica and Compton's Encyclopedia, to prepare the first feasibility studies for the 1964–1965 New York World's Fair. He was joined by Austrian architect Victor Gruen (creator of the shopping mall) in studies that eventually led the Eisenhower Commission to award the world's fair to New York City in competition with a number of American cities.

The year 1964 was nominally selected for the event to commemorate the 300th anniversary of the naming of New York, after King Charles II sent an English fleet to seize it from the Dutch in 1664. Prince James (the Duke of York) then renamed the former Dutch colony New Amsterdam as New York.

Organizers turned to private financing and the sale of bonds to pay the huge costs to stage the event. The organizers hired New York's "Master Builder" Robert Moses, to head the corporation established to run the fair because he was experienced in raising money for vast public projects. Moses had been a formidable figure in the city since coming to power in the 1930s. He was responsible for the construction of much of the city's highway infrastructure and, as parks commissioner for decades, the creation of much of the city's park system.

In the mid-1930s, Moses oversaw the conversion of a vast Queens tidal marsh garbage dump into the fairgrounds that hosted the 1939–1940 World's Fair. Called Flushing Meadows Park, it was Moses' grandest park scheme. When the 1939–1940 World's Fair ended in financial failure, Moses did not have the available funds to complete work on his project. He saw the 1964–1965 Fair as a means to finish what the earlier fair had begun.

To ensure profits to complete the park, fair organizers knew they would have to maximize receipts. An estimated attendance of 70 million people would be needed to turn a profit and, for attendance that large, the fair would need to be held for two years. The World's Fair Corporation also decided to charge site-rental fees to all exhibitors who wished to construct pavilions on the grounds. This decision caused the fair to come into conflict with the Bureau of International Expositions (BIE), as the international body headquartered in Paris that sanctions world's fairs: BIE rules stated that an international exposition could run for one six-month period only, and no rent could be charged to exhibitors. In addition, the rules allowed only one exposition in any given country within a 10-year period, and the Seattle World's Fair had already been sanctioned for 1962, as two years prior.

The United States was not a member of the BIE at the time, but fair organizers understood that approval by the BIE would ensure that its nearly 40 member nations would participate in the fair. Moses, undaunted by the rules, journeyed to Paris to seek official approval for the New York fair. When the BIE balked at New York's bid, Moses, used to having his way in New York, angered the BIE delegates by taking his case to the press, publicly stating his disdain for the BIE and its rules.  The BIE retaliated by formally requesting its member nations not to participate in the New York fair.  The 1964–1965 New York World's Fair is the only significant world's fair since the formation of the BIE to be held without its endorsement.

Architecture

Many of the pavilions were built in a Mid-century modern style that was heavily influenced by "Googie architecture". This was a futurist architectural style influenced by car culture, jet aircraft, the Space Age, and the Atomic Age, which were all on display at the fair. Some pavilions were explicitly shaped like the product they were promoting, such as the US Royal tire-shaped Ferris wheel, or even the corporate logo, such as the Johnson Wax pavilion. Other pavilions were more abstract representations, such as the oblate spheroid-shaped IBM pavilion, or the General Electric circular dome shaped "Carousel of Progress".

The pavilion architectures expressed a new-found freedom of form enabled by modern building materials, such as reinforced concrete, fiberglass, plastic, tempered glass, and stainless steel. The facade or the entire structure of a pavilion served as a giant billboard advertising the country or organization housed inside, flamboyantly competing for the attention of busy and distracted fairgoers.

By contrast, some of the smaller international, US state, and organizational pavilions were built in more traditional styles, such as a Chinese temple or a Swiss chalet. Countries took this opportunity to showcase culinary aspects of their culture as well, with fondue being promoted at the Swiss Pavilion's Alpine restaurant thanks to the Swiss Cheese Union. After the fair's final closing in 1965, some pavilions crafted of wood were carefully disassembled and transported elsewhere for re-use.

Other pavilions were "decorated sheds", a building method later described by Robert Venturi and Denise Scott Brown, using plain structural shells embellished with applied decorations. This allowed designers to simulate a traditional style while bypassing expensive and time-consuming methods of traditional construction. The expedient was considered acceptable for temporary buildings planned to be used for only two years, and then demolished.

The Underground World Home which was designed by architect Jay Swayze was also featured at the fair. Fairgoers could tour the home for the price of one dollar. It was a large underground bunker-home and it was unveiled in response to the Cold War. It featured air conditioning and backlit murals to create the illusion of the outdoor lighting. The murals were hand painted by Mrs. Glenn Smith.

International participation

The BIE withholding official recognition was a serious handicap for fair promoters. The absence of Canada, Australia, most of the major European nations, and the Soviet Union, all members of the BIE, tarnished the image of the fair. Additionally, New York was forced to compete with both Seattle and Montreal for international participants, with many nations choosing the officially-sanctioned world's fairs of those other North American cities over the New York Fair. The promoters turned to trade and tourism organizations within many countries to sponsor national exhibits in lieu of official government sponsorship of pavilions.

New York City, in the middle of the twentieth century, was at a zenith of economic power and world prestige. Unconcerned by BIE rules, nations with smaller economies (as well as private groups in (or relevant to) some BIE members) saw it as an honor to host an exhibit at the Fair. Therefore, smaller nations made up the majority of the international participation. Spain, Vatican City, Republic of China, Japan, Mexico, Sweden, Austria, Denmark, Thailand, Philippines, Greece, and Pakistan, and Ireland to name some, hosted national presences at the Fair. Indonesia sponsored a pavilion, but relations deteriorated rapidly between that nation and the US during 1964, fueled by anti-Western and anti-American rhetoric and policies by Indonesian president Sukarno, which angered US President Lyndon Johnson. Indonesia withdrew from the United Nations in January 1965, and officially from the Fair in March. The Fair Corporation then seized and shut down the Indonesian pavilion, and it remained closed and barricaded for the 1965 season.

One of the fair's most popular exhibits was the Vatican Pavilion, which featured Michelangelo's Pietà, brought in from St. Peter's Basilica with the permission of Pope John XXIII; today, a small plaza and exedra monument mark the spot (and Pope Paul VI's visit in October 1965). People waited in line for hours to view the Michelangelo sculpture; a novel conveyor belt system was used to move them through the viewing in an orderly fashion. A modern replica of the artwork had been transported beforehand to ensure that the statue could be installed without being damaged. The copy is now on view in the Immaculate Conception Seminary in Douglaston, Queens, New York. The exedra monument is now used with permits since 1975 for prayer vigils by Our Lady of the Roses relocated from Bayside, New York.

A recreation of a medieval Belgian village proved very popular. Fairgoers were treated to the "Bel-Gem Brussels Waffle"—a combination of waffle, strawberries and whipped cream, sold by a Brussels couple, Maurice Vermersch and his wife.

Fairgoers could also enjoy sampling sandwiches from around the world at the popular 7-Up International Sandwich Garden Pavilion which featured the innovative fiberglass Seven Up Tower. In addition to all the 7-Up beverages one could drink, fair-goers were invited to sample varied culinary delights representing sixteen countries. While dining, visitors enjoyed live performances on four circular stages from various instrumentalists which included a five piece musical ensemble, the 7-Up Continental Band. The musical programs included popular show tunes from the Broadway  stage in America, as well as musical favorites from both Europe and Latin America. The soloist John Serry Sr. appeared regularly with the orchestra to complement the international flavor of the musical program.

Emerging African nations displayed their wares in the Africa Pavilion. Controversy broke out when the Jordanian pavilion displayed a mural emphasizing the plight of the Palestinian people. The Jordanians also donated an ancient column which still remains at the former fair site.

The city of West Berlin, a Cold War hot-spot, hosted a popular exhibit in a pavilion that was designed by Hans Wehrhahn.

On April 21, 1965, as part of the opening ceremonies for the second season of the 1964–1965 New York World's Fair, Ethiopian long-distance runners Abebe Bikila and Mamo Wolde participated in an exclusive ceremonial half marathon. They ran from the Arsenal in Central Park at 64th Street & Fifth Avenue in Manhattan to the Singer Bowl at the fair. They carried with them a parchment scroll with greetings from Haile Selassie.

Federal and state exhibits

United States Pavilion
The United States Pavilion was titled "Challenge to Greatness", and focused on President Lyndon B. Johnson's "Great Society" proposals. The main show in the multimillion-dollar pavilion was a 15-minute ride through a filmed presentation of American history. Visitors seated in moving grandstands rode past movie screens that slid in, out, and above the path of the traveling audience.

Elsewhere, there were tributes to the late President John F. Kennedy, who had broken ground for the pavilion in December 1962 but had been assassinated in November 1963 before the fair opened.

A painting of the Belgian artist Luc-Peter Crombé received the main award of the jury. It is a semi-religious presentation of three young men challenging flames.

United States Space Park

A  United States Space Park was sponsored by NASA, the Department of Defense and the fair. Exhibits included a full-scale model of the aft skirt and five F-1 engines of the first stage of a Saturn V, a Titan II booster with a Gemini capsule, an Atlas with a Mercury capsule and a Thor-Delta rocket. On display at ground level were Aurora 7, the Mercury capsule flown by Scott Carpenter on the second US crewed orbital flight; full-scale models of an X-15 aircraft, an Agena upper stage; a Gemini spacecraft; an Apollo command/service module, and a Lunar Excursion Module. Replicas of uncrewed spacecraft included lunar probe Ranger VII; Mariner II and Mariner IV; Syncom, Telstar I, and Echo II communications satellites; Explorer I and Explorer XVI; and Tiros and Nimbus weather satellites.

New York State Pavilion

New York played host to the fair at its six-million-dollar open-air pavilion called the "Tent of Tomorrow". Designed by famed modernist architect Philip Johnson, the 350-feet-by-250-feet (107 × 76 m) pavilion was supported by sixteen 100-feet-high (30-metre) concrete columns, from which a 50,000-square-foot (4,600 m2) roof of polychrome tiles was suspended. Complementing the pavilion were the fair's three observation towers, two of which had cafeterias in their in-the-round observation-deck crowns. The pavilion's main floor, used for local art and industry displays including a  scale reproduction of the New York State Power Authority's St. Lawrence hydroelectric plant, comprised a 9,000-square-foot (800 m2) terrazzo replica of the official Texaco highway map of New York State, displaying the map's cities, towns, routes and Texaco gas stations in 567 mosaic panels.

Other state pavilions

Wisconsin exhibited the "World's Largest Cheese". Florida brought a dolphin show, flamingos, a talented cockatoo from Miami's Parrot Jungle, and water skiers to New York. Oklahoma gave weary fairgoers a restful park to relax in. Missouri displayed the state's space-related industries. Visitors could dine at Hawaii's "Five Volcanoes" restaurant.

New York City Pavilion
At the New York City pavilion, the Panorama of the City of New York (a huge scale model of the city) was on display, complete with a simulated helicopter ride around the metropolis for easy viewing. Left over from the 1939 Fair, this building had been used partially as a recreational public roller skating rink.

Bourbon Street Pavilion

Louisiana had a pavilion called "Louisiana's Bourbon Street" (later renamed to just "Bourbon Street"), which was inspired by New Orleans' French Quarter. It started off with financial trouble, not being able to complete its construction and subsequently filing for bankruptcy. A private company, called Pavilion Property, bought up the assets and assumed its debts. This prompted Louisiana Governor John McKeithen to sever all ties and withdraw state's sanction, leaving the pavilion completely to private enterprise.

Special media attention was given to a racially integrated minstrel show that was intended to be a satirical anti-bigotry review, called "America, Be Seated", and produced by Mike Todd Jr. During the opening of the fair, several civil rights protests were staged by members of the NAACP, who believed that the "minstrel-style" show was demeaning to African-Americans.

The pavilion included ten theater restaurants, which served a variety of Creole food, a Jazz club called "Jazzland" which hosted live jazz artists, miniature Mardi Gras parades, a teenage dancing venue, a voodoo shop, and a doll museum. Due to the presence of the various bars, the pavilion was especially popular at night. Notable go-go dancer Candy Johnson headlined a show at a venue called "Gay New Orleans Nightclub". Near the closure of the fair, the pavilion was reported to have achieved the highest gross income of any single commercial pavilion at the fair. The 26-year-old director of operations, Gordon Novel, was called an "Entrepreneurial Prodigy & Boy Wonder" in Variety for his accomplishments.

Civil rights protests 
The Congress of Racial Equality (CORE) organized a protest during the World's Fair. About 700 protestors participated; of those, 300 were arrested. Demonstrators used walkie-talkies to communicate during the protest. Protestors demanded that the Civil Rights Act be passed and criticized the lack of inclusive hiring for the World's Fair. During President Johnson's speech, demonstrators shouted "Jim Crow must go!" and "Freedom now!" and jeered as he outlined his plans for the Great Society. The mayor of New York later publicly apologized on behalf of the city.

More radically, Louis Lomax, of the Brooklyn chapter of CORE, had proposed a "stall-in"; 500 drivers would go to the fair and stop or deliberately run out of gas on the way there, creating a traffic jam. Because it would clog the highways, it would also have been a protest against Robert Moses and his newly renovated traffic networks.  Henry A. Barnes, the New York City Traffic Commissioner, made it illegal to intentionally run out of gas on a New York roadway.  Tactics such as using emergency brakes to stop subways and releasing rats during Johnson's speech were also proposed. James Farmer, who was the national chair of CORE at the time, suspended the group. Martin Luther King, Jr. wrote a letter stating that he did not support the stall-in as a tactic, but also would not condemn it. He wrote: "Which is worse, a ‘Stall-In’ at the World's Fair or a ‘Stall-In’ in the United States Senate? The former merely ties up the traffic of a single city. But the latter seeks to tie up the traffic of history, and endanger the psychological lives of twenty million people". Despite a New York Times article stating that "the stall is on", only a few drivers actually showed up. Isaiah Brunson, chair of the Brooklyn chapter, promised future protests, but went into hiding a few days later.

American industry
Many of the large US corporations built pavilions to demonstrate their wares, vision, and corporate cultures.
These included:

General Motors

Industries played a major role at the New York World's Fair of 1939–1940 by hosting huge, elaborate exhibits. Many of them returned to the New York World's Fair of 1964–1965 with even more elaborate versions of the shows that they had presented 25 years earlier. The most notable of these was General Motors Corporation whose Futurama II proved to be the fair's most popular exhibit, in which visitors seated in moving chairs glided past elaborately detailed miniature 3D model scenery showing what life might be like in the "near-future". Nearly 26 million people took the journey into the future during the fair's two-year run.

IBM
The IBM Corporation had a popular pavilion, where a giant 500-seat grandstand called the "People Wall" was pushed by hydraulic rams high up into an ellipsoidal theater designed by Eero Saarinen. There, a film by Charles and Ray Eames titled Think was shown on fourteen projectors on nine screens, illuminating the workings of computer logic. At ground level beneath the theater, visitors could explore Mathematica: A World of Numbers... and Beyond (an exhibit of mathematical models and curiosities) and view the Mathematics Peep Show (a series of short films illustrating basic mathematical concepts).

Bell System
The Bell System (prior to its break up into regional companies) hosted a 15-minute ride in moving armchairs depicting the history of communications in dioramas and film named Ride of Communications. Other Bell exhibits included the Picturephone as well as a demonstration of the computer modem.

Westinghouse

The Westinghouse Corporation planted a second time capsule next to an earlier 1939 version; today both Westinghouse Time Capsules are marked by a monument southwest of the Unisphere which is to be opened in the year 6939. Some of its contents were a World's Fair Guidebook, an electric toothbrush, credit cards (relatively new at the time), and a 50-star United States flag.

Sinclair Oil
The Sinclair Oil Corporation sponsored "Dinoland", featuring life-size replicas of nine different dinosaurs, including the corporation's signature Brontosaurus.  The statues were created by Louis Paul Jonas Studios in Hudson, New York. They also contained a "space age" gas station with orbiting gas pumps shaped like rockets, and a marine fuel station in the vicinity of the World's Fair Marina.

Ford
The Ford Motor Company introduced the Ford Mustang automobile to the public at its pavilion on April 17, 1964. The Ford pavilion featured the "Magic Skyway" ride, in which guests rode in Ford, Mercury, and Lincoln convertibles past scenes featuring dinosaurs and cavemen, concluding with a futuristic cityscape. The vehicles used were the Mustang, Galaxie, Thunderbird, Falcon, Mercury Park Lane, Mercury Comet and Lincoln Continental. After the Fair, the Audio-Animatronic dinosaurs would move to Disneyland, becoming part of the Santa Fe & Disneyland Railroad's "Primeval World" diorama in 1966, while the vehicles were collected by Ford and sent to the Dearborn Headquarters where employees purchased the cars as used and at a discount. When the fair opened again for 1965, all-new vehicles were again used as convertibles only.

DuPont
DuPont presented a musical review by composer Michael Brown called The Wonderful World of Chemistry.

Parker Pen
At the Parker Pen Company's exhibit, a computer would make a match to an international penpal.

Chunky Candy
The Chunky Candy Corporation put on what was a state-of-the-art, transparent display of candy manufacturing where visitors were able to view "all the steps in a highly automated process". The Pavilion also included an interactive sculpture playground called "Sculpture Continuum", designed by Oliver O'Connor Barrett.

Films
The fair was also a showplace for independent films. One of the most noted was a religious film titled Parable which showed at the Protestant Pavilion. It depicted humanity as a traveling circus and Jesus Christ as a clown. This marked the beginning of a new depiction of Jesus and was the inspiration for the 1971 musical Godspell. Parable later went on to be honored at Cannes, as well as the Edinburgh Film Festival and Venice Film Festival. Another religious film was presented by evangelist Billy Graham called Man in the 5th Dimension. It was shot in the 70mm Todd-AO widescreen process for exclusive presentation in a specially designed theater equipped with audio equipment that enabled viewers to listen to the film in Chinese, French, German, Japanese, Russian, and Spanish. The 13-½ minute film Man's Search for Happiness was made for the Mormon Pavilion.

The surprise hit of the fair was a non-commercial movie short presented by the SC Johnson Wax Company called To Be Alive!. The film celebrated the joy of life found worldwide and in all cultures, and it won a special award from the New York Film Critics Circle and the 1966 Academy Award for Best Documentary (Short Subject).

Disney influence

The fair is remembered as the venue that Walt Disney used to design and perfect his system of "Audio-Animatronics", in which electromechanical actuators and computers control the movement of lifelike robots to act out scenes. WED Enterprises designed and created four shows at the fair:

 "Pepsi-Cola Presents Walt Disney's 'It's a Small World'—a Salute to UNICEF and the World's Children" at the Pepsi-Cola pavilion: Animated dolls and animals frolicked in a spirit of international unity accompanying a boat ride around the world. The song was written by the Sherman Brothers.
 General Electric sponsored "Progressland" where audiences were seated in a series of ring-shaped revolving auditoriums called the "Carousel of Progress", where they viewed an audio-animatronic presentation of the historical progress of electrical technology in the home. The Sherman Brothers composed the theme song "There's a Great Big Beautiful Tomorrow" for this attraction. The highlight of the exhibit demonstrated a brief plasma "explosion" of controlled nuclear fusion.
 Ford Motor Company presented "Ford's Magic Skyway", a WED Imagineering-designed pavilion which was the second-most popular exhibit at the fair. It featured 354 1964 and 1965 Ford, Mercury and Lincoln convertible vehicles with the engines, transmissions and gas tanks removed, including the all-new Mustang, in an early prototype of what became the PeopleMover ride system. Audience members entered the vehicles on the main platform as they moved slowly along the track. The ride moved the audience through scenes featuring life-sized, audio-animatronic dinosaurs and cavemen concluding with a diorama of a futuristic city. When the fair opened again in 1965, the vehicles were updated to 1965 models of the same convertible models. A video compilation was released using sketches from the original project.
 At the Illinois pavilion, a lifelike President Abraham Lincoln recited his famous speeches in "Great Moments with Mr. Lincoln", voiced by Royal Dano.

WED also created the  Tower of the Four Winds which was located at the It's a Small World pavilion. In addition, costumed versions of Walt Disney's famous cartoon characters roamed around the fairgrounds and interacted with guests. After the fair, there was some discussion of The Walt Disney Company retaining these exhibits on-site and converting Flushing Meadows Park into an East Coast version of Disneyland, but this idea was abandoned. Instead, Disney relocated several of the exhibits to Disneyland in Anaheim, California, and subsequently replicated them at other Disney theme parks. Walt Disney World near Orlando, Florida, which opened with Magic Kingdom in 1971, is essentially the realization of the original concept of an "East Coast Disneyland"; Epcot, which opened in 1982, was designed as a permanent world's fair.

Music
The fair featured an official band, the Cities Services World's Band of America (C.S.W.F.B.A.) conducted by Paul Lavalle. It was a 50-piece group, operating seven days a week, on location 7 to 9 hours a day. They toured the fairgrounds on a 72-foot long bandwagon that went into a V-shape when performing. The opening day's big musical performance was Lavalle conducting a 94-piece orchestra in the world premiere of Ferde Grofé's "World's Fair Suite" commissioned by Bob Moses. Moses had previously commissioned Grofé to compose the theme for his 1939 New York World's Fair. Mr. Grofé was present, listening from a wheelchair, having suffered a stroke in 1961. His score was in five movements—"Unisphere", "International", "Fun at the Fair", "Pavilions of Industry" and "National". Numerous other ensembles performed throughout the fair, including Guy Lombardo and the United States Marine Band.

Amusement attractions

One of the fair's major crowd-attracting and financial shortcomings was the absence of a midway. The fair's organizers were opposed on principle to the honky-tonk atmosphere engendered by midways, and this omission was another thing that had irked the BIE, which insisted that all officially sanctioned fairs have a midway. What amusements the fair actually hosted often failed to attract crowds. The Meadow Lake Amusement Area was not easily accessible, and officials objected to shows being advertised.

Furthermore, although the Amusement Area was supposed to remain open for four hours after the exhibits closed at 10pm, the fair presented a fountain-and-fireworks show every night at 9pm at the Pool of Industry. Fairgoers would see this show and then leave the fair rather than head to the Amusement Area, and few people remained on the fairgrounds by midnight.

The fair's big entertainment spectacles, including the Wonder World at the Meadow Lake Amphitheater, To Broadway with Love in the Texas Pavilion, and Dick Button's Ice-travaganza in the New York City Pavilion, all were closed prematurely with heavy financial losses. It became apparent that fairgoers did not go to the fair for its entertainment value, especially as there was plenty of entertainment in Manhattan.

A notable exception to this situation was Les Poupées de Paris (The Dolls of Paris), an adults-only musical puppet show created, produced and directed by Sid and Marty Krofft. This show, modeled after the Paris revues Lido and Folies Bergère, was heavily attended, and financially successful.

Some spectacles were staged for the newsreel cameras, such as a May 1964 demonstration by Bell Aerosystems where Bill Suitor ("Jetpackman") performed a 16-second flight, hopping over the "Court of the Presidents of the United States", the circular path surrounding the Unisphere fountain.

Controversial ending
The fair ended in controversy over allegations of financial mismanagement. Controversy had plagued it during much of its two-year run. The Fair Corporation sold advanced tickets ahead of opening for each season, thus reflecting distorted profits compared to actual sales during the seasons. The receipts of advanced sales were booked entirely against the first season of the fair. This made it appear that the fair had plenty of operating cash when, in fact, it was borrowing from the second season's gate to pay the bills. Before and during the 1964 season, the fair spent much money despite underwhelming attendance, below expectations. By the end of the 1964 season, Moses and the press began to realize that there would not be enough money to pay the bills, and accordingly the fair teetered on bankruptcy. In March 1965, a group of bankers and politicians asked showman Billy Rose to take over the fair, which he declined, stating: "I'd rather be hit by a baseball bat", adding that "cancer in its last stages never attracted me very much".

While the 1939–1940 New York World's Fair returned 40 cents on the dollar to bond investors, the 1964–1965 fair returned only 19.2 cents on the dollar.

Reuse of site and structures

On-site structures

New York City was left with a much-improved Flushing Meadows–Corona Park following the fair, taking possession of the park from the Fair Corporation in June 1967. Today, the paths and their names remain almost unchanged from the days of the fair.

The Unisphere stands at the center of the park as a symbol of "Man's Achievements on a Shrinking Globe in an Expanding Universe". The Unisphere has become the iconic sculptural feature of the park, as well as a symbol of the borough of Queens in general. It stands on the site formerly occupied by the Perisphere during the earlier 1939–1940 Fair.

An ancient Roman column from Jordan still stands near the Unisphere.  A stone bench marking the site of the Vatican pavilion also stands east of the main fountain.

The New York Hall of Science, founded during the 1964 World's Fair, was one of the country's first dedicated science museums; it still operates in an expanded facility in its original location at the park's northern corner. The Hall of Science anchors a Space Park exhibiting the rockets and vehicles used in America's early space exploration projects. The Space Park gradually deteriorated due to neglect, but in 2004 the surviving rockets were restored and placed back on display.

The carousel that was the centerpiece of Carousel Park in the Lake Amusement Area was relocated to the former Transportation Area outside of the Queens Zoo in the northwestern part of the park. It still operates as the Flushing Meadows Carousel, and is now listed on the National Register of Historic Places.

The New York State Pavilion, constructed as the state's exhibit hall for the World's Fair, is also a prominent visible structure in the park. However, no new use for the building was found after the Fair, and the building sat derelict and decaying for decades. A suggestion to reinstall the mosaic floor at the World Trade Center did not materialize.

In 1993, the Queens Theatre in the Park took over the Circarama adjacent to the towers and continues to operate there, using the ruined state pavilion as a storage depot.  The ruins were featured in the 1997 movie Men in Black. Some conservation and restoration techniques were demonstrated in 2008 by researchers from the University of Pennsylvania. The New York State Pavilion was listed on the National Register of Historic Places in 2009.

In fall 2013, NYC Parks announced plans to restore the pavilion for $73 million, and in 2015, the entire structure was repainted yellow.

A pre-existing structure from the 1939 fair served as the temporary headquarters of the United Nations General Assembly, and then became the New York City Pavilion in the 1964 fair. Afterwards, it was subdivided into the Queens Center for Art (now Queens Museum) and an ice-skating rink. The Museum continues to display the scale model Panorama of the City of New York, which is updated occasionally. The Museum also has a large display of memorabilia from the two world's fairs, as well as an original 3D scale model of the entire 1964 World's Fair site. The space formerly occupied by the ice skating rink was incorporated into the museum's expansion, completed in 2013.

The Pavilion (World's Fair Building / Winston Churchill Tribute) was dismantled after the fair, and reassembled by 1968 on the fairgrounds site as the aviary for the Flushing Meadows Zoo (now the Queens Zoo). The building was a  diameter geodesic dome attributed to either Buckminster Fuller or Thomas C. Howard, and produced by Synergetics of Raleigh, North Carolina. It remains as the aviary of the Queens Zoo, which was closed in 1988 and then reopened in 1992 after a $16 million renovation project.

Other buildings remained for a while after the 1964 Fair's conclusion in hopes that a new use for them could be found, but were subsequently demolished. This included the Travel and Transportation Pavilion, destroyed in 1967 after a failed conversion to a fire station, and the Federal Pavilion, demolished in 1977 after extensive deterioration.

Pavilions and major exhibits elsewhere

Like its 1939 predecessor, the 1964 World's Fair lost money. It was unable to repay its financial backers their investment, and it became embroiled in legal disputes with its creditors until 1970, when the books were finally closed and the Fair Corporation was dissolved. Most of the pavilions constructed for the fair were demolished within six months following the fair's close. While only a handful of pavilions and exhibits survived, some of them traveled great distances and found new homes following the fair:

 The Austria pavilion became a ski lodge at Cockaigne Ski Resort in western New York. On January 25, 2011, the building was destroyed by fire.
 The Wisconsin pavilion's front teepee-like portion became a radio station in Neillsville, Wisconsin. The pavilion's large rear structure that formed a squat-looking "H" (if seen from above) is the combined kitchen, dining hall, and recreation hall of Camp Ramah in upstate Lakewood, Pennsylvania.
 The US Royal tire-shaped Ferris wheel was relocated to become a landmark along Interstate 94 in the Metro Detroit Downriver community of Allen Park, Michigan.
 The Pavilion of Spain relocated to St. Louis, Missouri, and is now a part of a Hilton Hotel.
 The Parker Pen pavilion became offices for the Lodge of Four Seasons in Lake of the Ozarks, Missouri.
 The Golden Rondelle Theater was reworked by Taliesin Associated Architects, and moved to the S. C. Johnson administration complex in Racine, Wisconsin, which was designed by Frank Lloyd Wright.
 The chapel and stained glass windows from the Vatican pavilion were built into a Roman Catholic church called Saint Mary Mother of the Redeemer in Groton, Connecticut.
 The Christian Science pavilion became a church in Poway, California. The structure was demolished in 2006.
 The Mormon pavilion became a church in Plainview, New York, dedicated December 2, 1967, and is still in use.
 A large oil painting of a woman, painted in 1964 by Roy Lichtenstein and titled New York World's Fair, is in the Weisman Art Museum in Minneapolis, Minnesota.
 The carillon from the Coca-Cola Pavilion was moved to Stone Mountain Park, near Atlanta, Georgia. The musical instrument was expanded from 610 to 732 bells in total.
 Mathematica: A World of Numbers... and Beyond, an interactive exhibit from the IBM Pavilion, was relocated to the Pacific Science Center in Seattle, but is no longer there. An identical copy of the exhibit was obtained by the New York Hall of Science around 2000, and now remains on display not far from the site of the original 1964 installation.
 For many years the fair's amateur radio station console was used by the American Radio Relay League. Later sold, in 2006 it was purchased by a Collins Radio collector in Texas.
 The illuminated "G" from the large fiberglass square and compasses that stood in front of the Masonic Brotherhood Center was moved to the New York Masonic Home campus in Utica, New York, and installed into a smaller sculpture. The Grand Lodge of New York installed a bronze sculpture by artist Donald De Lue, of George Washington in Masonic regalia at the fairgrounds after it closed. It still stands near the soccer fields. (De Lue also sculpted the Fair's iconic Rocket Thrower sculpture.)
 Sinclair Oil "Dinoland" spent a period of time as a traveling exhibit. The Stegosaurus model was eventually donated to Dinosaur National Monument. The Stegosaurus and some of the others still remain in displays at various locations.
 The Disney-created attraction It's a Small World was transferred to Disneyland, along with the "Carousel of Progress" and the first Abraham Lincoln audio-animatronic figure for the original Great Moments With Mr. Lincoln show. Scenery and the audio-animatronics dinosaurs from the Ford Magic Skyway show were installed in the Disneyland Railroad's Primeval World Diorama, and the attraction's actual WEDway ride system was improved upon and re-used for Tomorrowland's PeopleMover.
 Some of the light fixtures that lined the walkways can be found still functioning at Penn Hills Resort in the Pocono Mountains, Analomink, Pennsylvania, and the Orange County Fairgrounds in Middletown, New York. Until 2011, Canobie Lake Park in Salem, New Hampshire, also had the Illuminators, but they have since been replaced. Canobie Lake Park also has been reusing street mailbox-shaped trash cans from the World's Fair.
 The Skyway cable car tower structures and gondolas were moved to Six Flags Great Adventure (at that time called Great Adventure) in New Jersey for use from 1974 to the present.
 The New England Pavilion was disassembled and moved to South Portland, Maine, where most of it was reassembled and used as a small shopping mall at 50 Maine Mall Road. In August 2016, these buildings were torn down to make way for new businesses.
 The Triumph of Man exhibit from the Traveler's Insurance Pavilion was on display at the original location of the Center of Science and Industry (COSI) in Columbus, Ohio, from 1966 to 1999 when the museum moved. It had been revamped as the Time Tunnel in 1983.
 The Belgian Village carousel after the 1964 World's Fair went to Montreal, Quebec, Canada, where it was part of Expo '67 in the Carrefour International at the La Ronde amusement area. After that fair closed, the ride was moved into the Kiddieland area of the now-permanent La Ronde Amusement Park. The 1885 "Le Galopant" carousel was restored in 2008 and still turns in LaRonde today, which is now owned by Six Flags.
 The R33 and R36 cars built for the New York City Subway's IRT Flushing Line ran in revenue service through 2003. Some of the rolling stock still survives today in maintenance work use or in storage. Five of these cars (9306, 9307, 9310, 9586, 9587) are in the collection of the New York Transit Museum, with 9306 regularly on display there. The rest of the fleet has been sunk to the bottom of the Atlantic Ocean as part of the "Redbird Reef" off the coast of the Northeast US, to serve as an artificial barrier reef habitat for marine life.
 One of the 11 steel arches commissioned by General Mills for the fair was later moved to the Rocky Point Amusement Park in Warwick, Rhode Island, although it is unclear when, why or how it came to be placed in the park. The arch remained in Rocky Point after the amusement park was closed and abandoned in 1995. It was repainted and restored in 2016, and acts as an entrance landmark for the current Rocky Point State Park.
 The Queens Museum has approximately 900 items on permanent display from both the 1964/1965 and 1939/1940 World's Fairs.

In media

 Connecticut Public Television produced The 1964 World's Fair, a documentary about the fair narrated by Judd Hirsch (1996). Other documentaries about the fair are After the Fair, Peace Through Understanding: The 1964/65 New York World's Fair, and Modern Ruin: A World’s Fair Pavilion.
 The first Batman episode, "Hi Diddle Riddle" (1966), opens with thirty seconds of stock footage of the fair.
 In the 1993 animated film Batman: Mask of the Phantasm the "Gotham World's Fair" seen in flashbacks is modeled after the New York World's Fair, featuring the globe centerpiece, a PeopleMover, a "Home of the Future", and a concept car that apparently inspired the design of the Batmobile. Later in the film, the abandoned fairgrounds are used as The Joker's hideout. When attempting to escape Batman, he uses the Bell Rocket Belt demonstrated at the New York World's Fair.
 The 1997 film Men in Black presents the fair as having been a cover for the first arrival of alien life forms on Earth, with their two spaceships being incorporated into the observation towers. 
 The fair features heavily in the 2015 Disney film Tomorrowland.
 Alternative rock band They Might Be Giants have often referred to the exposition in their songs, including the song "Ana Ng" referencing the event directly, and the music video for "Don't Let's Start" which was filmed on the former site of the fair.
 In the 1965 season 5 The Flintstones episode "Time Machine" Fred and Wilma Flintstone, and Barney and Betty Rubble attend the World's Fair. There was also a comic book about their visit. The event is also mentioned in "The Hatrocks And The Gruesomes", as well as the Jonny Quest episode "Attack Of The Tree People".
In season one of The Amazing Race (2001), the Unisphere hosted the Finish Line for the inaugural season.
 In the Marvel Cinematic Universe the fair is depicted as having been organised by Howard Stark and in Iron Man 2 it is revealed that the fairgrounds layout depicts the formula for a new element he had synthesised. Decades later his son Tony Stark used the fairgrounds to host his own Stark expo which is attacked at the climax of the film.
 In the season two episode of Godfather of Harlem, titled It's A Small World, the opening scene takes place at site of the fair during its set-up.

Gallery

See also

 List of world expositions
 List of world's fairs

References

Notes

Bibliography
 World's Fair Legacies William P. Young.
 Flushing Meadows-Corona Park Today William P. Young
 International Participation in the New York World's Fair 1964–1965. Sharyn Elise Jackson.
 Editors, Time-Life Books Official Guide: 1964–1965 New York World's Fair. Book Sales: 1963–1965.
 Third Supplemental Report on New York World's Fair 1964–1965 Corporation Covering Operations from Inception to December 31, 1966. October 26, 1967.
 
 
 New York Public Library archives of '64–'65 World's Fair. Manuscripts & Archives Division of Fair Administration, Construction, Maintenance, Participation, and Public Relations.
 Gordon, John Steele, "The World's Fair: It was a disaster from the beginning", American Heritage Magazine, October 2006, Volume 57, Issue 5.

External links

 The website of the 1964/1965 New York World's Fair - nywf64.com 
 New York State Pavilion Project
 New York 1964–1965 World's Fair

 
Flushing Meadows–Corona Park
1960s in Queens
Robert Moses projects
1964 in New York City
1964 in science
Futurism
1965 in New York City
New York (state) historical anniversaries